Luplow is a surname. Notable people with the surname include:

Al Luplow (1939–2017), American baseball player
Jordan Luplow (born 1993), American baseball player, great-nephew of Al

See also
Ludlow (name)